was a battle during the Sengoku period (16th century) of Japan. It was fought at a field called Suriagehara, whose modern location is split between the towns of Inawashiro and Bandai in Fukushima Prefecture.

Background
The Battle of Suriagehara served as the aftermath of the Siege of Kurokawa, in which Satake Yoshinobu with his 16,000 men stole the moment to enact revenge for their previous defeat at Kurokawa Castle.

Battle
Date Masamune, with his superior 23,000 troops, defeated the Ashina. While some Ashina forces withdrew across the Nippashi River to Kurokawa, the bridge gave out amidst their retreat, leaving many Ashina troops to be cut down when the Date forces overtook them. According to the 17th century text Ōū Eikei Gunki, there were around 500 Ashina troops killed at the Nippashi River alone.

Aftermath
This battle helped seal the Date clan's hegemony over southern Mutsu Province. However, despite the victory, resistance after the battle continued, notably from the pro-Ashina, Nikaidō and Ishikawa clans.

The battle later served as the basis for the Noh play "Suriage." According to local lore, the Tohoku folk song "Sansa Shigure" was written by Masamune in the celebrations following this Date victory.

References

Date Shigezane. Shigezane-ki. pp. 207-329 of Sendai Sōsho Volume 3. Sendai: Sendai Sōsho Kankōkai, 1923.

1589 in Japan
Suriagehara
Suriagehara
Date clan
Suriagehara